Marion Lennox (born 1953) is a writer of over 110 romance novels. She began publishing in 1990, and has also written romantic novels under another pseudonym, Trisha David.

Biography
Marion Lennox was born in Australia in 1953. She was raised in a farming community. She has taught statistics, been a medical receptionist, and been employed in computing at university. She is married and has two children and lives in Queenscliff, Victoria.

In search of an occupation she could pursue from home, Lennox decided to attempt novel writing. In 1988, she wrote a medical romance, Dare to Love Again, which was to be her first published novel. It was released in 1990, and since then, she has been a prolific producer of romances.

Lennox has won two Romance Writers of America RITA Awards in 2004 and 2006 for the year's Best Traditional Romance.

Awards
McTavish and Twins by Trisha David: 1999 RWAustralia's Romantic Book of the Year Finalist
Marrying William by Trisha David: 2000 RWAustralia's Romantic Book of the Year Finalist
Falling for Jack by Trisha David: 2000 RWAustralia's Romantic Book of the Year Finalist
The Baby Affair by Marion Lennox: 2000 RWAustralia's Romantic Book of the Year Finalist
Marriage for Maggie by Trisha David: 2001 RWAustralia's Romantic Book of the Year Finalist
Bachelor Cure by Marion Lennox: 2001 RWAustralia's Romantic Book of the Year Finalist
Tom Bradley’s Babies by Marion Lennox: 2001 RWAmerica's RITA Finalist in Traditional Romance
Her Royal Baby by Marion Lennox: 2004 Rita Awards Best Novel winner
Princess of Convenience by Marion Lennox: 2006 Rita Awards Best Novel winner

Bibliography

As Marion Lennox

Single Novels
Dare to Love Again (1990)
Cruel Country (1990)
Doctor Transformed (1991)
A Bitter Judgement (1991)
Wings of Healing (1992)
The Healing Heart (1992)
The Last Eden (1993)
A Loving Legacy (1993)
Legacy of Shadows (1993)
One Caring Heart (1994)
Storm Haven (1994)
Practice Makes Marriage (1995)
Doctor's Honour (1995)
Dangerous Physician (1995)
Enchanting Surgeon (1995)
A Christmas Blessing (1995)
Bush Doctor's Bride (1996)
Bridal Remedy (1996)
Promise of a Miracle (1997)
Dr. McIver's Baby (1998)
Hijacked Honeymoon (1998)
Bachelor Cure (1999)
Bushfire Bride (2000)
Tom Bradley's Babies (2000)
A Forever Family (2000)
Doctor on Loan (2001)
Emergency Wedding (2001)
Dr. Blake's Angel (2002)
A Royal Proposition (2002)
Tell No One (2003)
Stormbound Surgeon (2003)
To the Doctor, a Daughter (2003)
Her Royal Baby (2003)
In Dr Darling's Care (2004)
The Last-Minute Marriage (2004)
The Doctor's Special Touch (2005)
Rescued by a Millionaire (2005)
Bride by Accident (2005)
Rescue at Cradle Lake (2006)
The Surgeon's Family Miracle (2006)
His Secret Love-Child (2006)
The Prince's Outback Bride (2007)
His Miracle Bride (2007)
Their Lost & Found Family (2007)
Dynamite Doc or Christmas Dad? (2011)

Harlequin Prescription:  Romance Series
Prescription-One Bride (1996)
Prescription-One Husband (1996)
Bachelor Cure (1999)
The Baby Affair (1999)

Parents Wanted Series
A Child in Need (2000)
Their Baby Bargain (2001)
Adopted, Twins! (2001)
The Doctor's Baby (2002)

Australians Series Multi-Author
A Millionaire for Molly (2002)

Maitland Maternity Series Multi-Author
23. Adopt a Dad (2003)

Air Rescue Series Multi-Author
The Doctor's Rescue Mission (2005)

Police Surgeons Series Multi-Author
The Police Doctor's Secret (2004)

Heart to Heart Series Multi-Author
Princess of Convenience (2005)

Castle at Dolphin Bay Series
The Doctor's Proposal (2006)
The Heir's Chosen Bride (2006)
HIs Miracle Bride (2007)

Collections
Dr Blake's Angel / To the Doctor – A Daughter (2004)

Omnibus In Collaboration
Comfort and Joy (1997) (with Lynne Collins, Sharon Kendrick and Laura MacDonald)
Mistletoe Miracles (2000) (with Catherine George and Betty Neels) (Dearest Eulalia / The Extra-special Gift/ The Doorstep Baby)
Prescription Pregnancy (2001) (with Caroline Anderson and Josie Metcalfe)
Outback Husbands (2002) (with Margaret Way)
Doctors Down Under (2002) (with Alison Roberts and Meredith Webber)
Australian Playboys (2003) (with Helen Bianchin and Margaret Way)
Australian Tycoons (2004) (with Emma Darcy and Margaret Way)
Bride at Birralee / Stormbound Surgeon (2004) (with Barbara Hannay)
Shadowing Shahna / Millionaire for Molly (2004) (with Laurey Bright)
Christmas Deliveries (2004) (with Caroline Anderson and Sarah Morgan)
Red Thunder Reckoning / The Last-Minute Marriage (2005) (with Sylvie Kurtz)
Her Royal Baby / Passion Price (2005) (with Miranda Lee)
Her Nine Month Miracle (2005) (with Barbara Hannay and Cathy Williams)
Precious Gifts (2005) (with Kate Hardy and Josie Metcalfe)
Twins Come Too! (2006) (with Jessica Hart and Sara Wood)
Christmas Proposals (2006) (with Carole Mortimer and Rebecca Winters) (Her Christmas Romeo / Tycoon's Christmas Engagement / Bride For Christmas)
Royal Proposals (2006) (with Robyn Donald and Barbara McMahon)
Australian Heroes (2007) (with Fiona McArthur and Margaret Way)

As Trisha David

Single Novels
McTavish And Twins (1997)
Mcallister's Baby (1997)
Bride by Friday (1998)
Borrowed – One Bride (1998)
Falling For Jack (1999)
Marrying William (1999)
Marriage for Maggie (1999)
Bride 2000 (1999)

External links

Marion Lennox Webpage in Fantastic Fiction's Website

1953 births
Australian romantic fiction writers
Australian women novelists
Living people
RITA Award winners
Women romantic fiction writers